Tuṣita (Sanskrit) or Tusita (Pāli) is one of the six deva-worlds of the Kāmadhātu, located between the Yāma heaven and the  heaven.  Like the other heavens,  is said to be reachable through meditation. It is the heaven where the Bodhisattva Śvetaketu (Pāli: Setaketu, "White Banner") resided before being reborn on Earth as Gautama, the historical Buddha; it is, likewise, the heaven where the Bodhisattva Nātha ("Protector") currently resides, who will later be born as the next Buddha, Maitreya.

Most Buddhist literature holds that Queen Maya died seven days after the birth of her son the Buddha, and was then reborn in the Tushita Heaven. Seven years after the Buddha's enlightenment, she came down to visit Tavatimsa Heaven, where the Buddha later preached the Abhidharma to her.

In Hinduism, the tushitas are referred to as one of the nine gana deities: adityas, visvedevas, vasus, tushitas, abhasvaras, anilas, maharajikas, sadhyas, and the rudras.

Descriptions 

Like all heaven realms in Buddhism, the  Heaven is the residence of divine beings or devas.  According to the Visakhuposatha Sutta of the Pali Canon, time runs much differently than on Earth:

Mahayana View
In Mahayana Buddhist thought, the  Heaven is where all Bodhisattvas destined to reach full enlightenment in their next life dwell for a time.  One such reference can be found in the Larger Sutra of Immeasurable Life, a Mahayana text:

The  heaven is therefore closely associated with Maitreya, and many Buddhists vow to be reborn there so that they can hear the teachings of the Bodhisattva and ultimately be reborn with him when he becomes a Buddha.  Other Bodhisattvas dwell in this heaven realm from time to time.   is part of the same world-system as Earth, and so is relatively close, whereas the Pure Land of Amitabha Buddha is treated as a separate world-system entirely.

References 

Buddhist cosmology